State Highway 59 (SH 59) is a  state highway in eastern Colorado. SH 59's southern terminus is at U.S. Route 40 (US 40) and US 287 in Kit Carson, and the northern terminus is at US 138 in Sedgwick.

Route description
SH 59 begins in the south at a junction with U.S. Highway 40 in Kit Carson. From there, the road proceeds northward for  before intersecting Interstate 70 at that highway's exit 405 just south of the Seibert city limits. Highway 59 then continues north through Siebert for another  to join with U.S. Highway 36 just east of Cope. Continuing northward, the road then travels for another  to Haxtun where the route intersects U.S. Highway 6. From Haxton, Highway 59 travels north for a further  before crossing Interstate 76 at I-76's exit 165 roughly three miles south of Sedgwick. After three more miles the road reaches its northern terminus at a junction with U.S. Highway 138 at Sedgwick near the Nebraska state line. Through nearly its entire length, the road passes through remote, very sparsely populated agricultural areas.

History
The route was established in the 1920s and paved by 1938.

Major intersections

References

External links

059
Transportation in Cheyenne County, Colorado
Transportation in Kit Carson County, Colorado
Transportation in Washington County, Colorado
Transportation in Yuma County, Colorado
Transportation in Phillips County, Colorado
Transportation in Sedgwick County, Colorado